Ministry of Municipal Affairs and Housing may refer to:
 Ministry of Municipal Affairs and Housing (Ontario)
 Ministry of Municipal Affairs and Housing (Quebec)